The women's 200 metre butterfly event at the 2016 Summer Olympics took place between 9–10 August at the Olympic Aquatics Stadium.

Summary
Spain's Mireia Belmonte stormed home on the final lap to upgrade her silver from London 2012 with an Olympic title in this event, writing a historic milestone to become the country's first female swimming champion. Closing the gap between herself and Madeline Groves at the 150-metre turn, she pipped the Australian challenger with a half-stroke swim on the final stretch to a striking gold-medal triumph in 2:04.85. Groves commanded a solid lead through the first half of the race, but could not catch the Spaniard near the wall, stopping just 0.03 seconds behind with a 2:04.88 for the silver. Meanwhile, Japan's Natsumi Hoshi delivered a powerful back-half strategy to hold on the two leaders and repeat her bronze-medal feat from London 2012 in 2:05.20.

Swimming in lane eight, Cammile Adams of the United States missed out on the podium by seven tenths of a second, as she moved up from the outside to fourth with a lifetime best of 2:05.90. Separated from each other by a 0.03-second gap, Chinese duo Zhou Yilin (2:07.37) and Zhang Yufei (2:07.40) picked up the fifth and sixth spots respectively. Adams' teammate Hali Flickinger (2:07.71) and Australian youngster Brianna Throssell (2:07.87) closed out the field.

Notable swimmers missed the final roster, including British duo Hannah Miley and Aimee Willmott, Germany's Franziska Hentke, the reigning European champion, and Hungary's Katinka Hosszú, who later scratched the afternoon prelims to prepare herself instead for a historic medley double that happened in the evening session of the same day.

Records
Prior to this competition, the existing world and Olympic records were as follows.

Competition format

The competition consisted of three rounds: heats, semifinals, and a final. The swimmers with the best 16 times in the heats advanced to the semifinals. The swimmers with the best 8 times in the semifinals advanced to the final. Swim-offs were used as necessary to break ties for advancement to the next round.

Results

Heats

Semifinals

Semifinal 1

Semifinal 2

Final

References

External links
 Heat Results

Women's 00200 metre butterfly
Olympics
2016 in women's swimming
Women's events at the 2016 Summer Olympics